James Edward Abbott,  (August 18, 1942 – July 26, 2020) was a Canadian politician, a Conservative member of the House of Commons of Canada. Abbott was a member of the Reform Party from 1993 to 2000 and a member of the Canadian Alliance from 2000 to 2004.  Originally representing the riding of Kootenay East, he had represented Kootenay—Columbia since the boundaries were redrawn, and the name changed, in 1997. Before retiring, Abbott was the Parliamentary Secretary to the Minister for International Cooperation (Canada). On October 15, 2007, he was sworn in as a member of the Queen's Privy Council for Canada, and as such was entitled to the style "The Honourable" for life.

On June 30, 2010, he attended the inauguration of President Benigno Aquino III in the Philippines, as the representative of Canada.

Abbott died in Cranbrook, British Columbia on July 26, 2020, at the age of 77.

Electoral record

References

External links 
 Official site
 How'd They Vote?: Jim Abbott's voting history and quotes
 

1942 births
Canadian Alliance MPs
Canadian people of British descent
Conservative Party of Canada MPs
2020 deaths
Members of the House of Commons of Canada from British Columbia
Members of the King's Privy Council for Canada
Politicians from Toronto
Reform Party of Canada MPs
20th-century Canadian legislators
21st-century Canadian legislators